Hiccoda is a genus of moths of the family Erebidae. The genus was erected by Frederic Moore in 1882.

Species
Some species of this genus are:
Hiccoda clarae Berio, 1947
Hiccoda dosaroides Moore, 1882
Hiccoda eccausta Hampson 1910
Hiccoda nigripalpis (Walker, 1866)
Hiccoda plebeia (Butler 1889)
Hiccoda roseitincta Hampson, 1920

References
Moore, 1882.Descriptions of New Indian Lepidopterous Insects from the Collection of the Late Mr. W.S. Atkinson (2): p. 134.

Boletobiinae
Noctuoidea genera